Marion Lake is a lake in Dakota County, in the U.S. state of Minnesota.

Marion Lake was named by Marion W. Savage, proprietor of the Dan Patch Air Rail and owner of the famous race horse Dan Patch. This was also the site of Antler's Park, an amusement park for swimming, dancing and picnics. The park was created as the last destination of the Dan Patch Air Rail.

See also
List of lakes in Minnesota
Dan Patch

References

Lakes of Minnesota
Lakes of Dakota County, Minnesota